The R513 road is a regional road in County Cork and County Limerick, Ireland.

It was formerly the trunk road T50.

References

Roads Act 1993 (Classification of Regional Roads) Order 2006 – Department of Transport

Regional roads in the Republic of Ireland
Roads in County Cork
Roads in County Limerick